John Armstrong may refer to:

Politicians
John Alexander Macdonald Armstrong (1877–1926), Canadian politician
John Armstrong (Australian politician) (1908–1977)
John Armstrong (New Zealand politician) (1935–2018)
John Armstrong Jr. (1758–1843), soldier and U.S. Secretary of War
John Armstrong Sr. (1717–1795), American general and Continental Congressman
John Franklin Armstrong (1819–1887), schoolteacher and Texas state representative
John Armstrong (Irish politician), MP for Fore

Religion
John Armstrong (archbishop of Armagh) (1915–1987), Anglican bishop
John Armstrong (bishop of Grahamstown) (1813–1856), Anglican bishop
John Armstrong (bishop of Bermuda) (1905–1992), Anglican bishop
John Armstrong (dean of Kilfenora) (1792–1856), Anglican priest in Ireland

Sports
Jock Armstrong (born 1970), Scottish rally driver
John Armstrong (cricketer) (born 1981), England
John Armstrong (footballer, born 1890) (1890–1950), England
John Armstrong (footballer, born 1936), Scotland
John Armstrong (footballer, born 1987), Scotland
John Armstrong (rugby league), Australia
John Lee Armstrong (1932–2012), American football player and coach
John Armstrong (American football), American football defensive back 
Johnny Armstrong (1897–1960), American football player

Others
John Armstrong (architect) (1857–1941), Scotland
John Armstrong (artist) (1893–1973), UK
John Armstrong (British Army officer) (1674–1742), Surveyor General
John Armstrong (British writer/philosopher) (born 1966)
John Armstrong (Carolina) (1735–1784), American soldier and land registrar
John Armstrong (of Carrick) (1909–1984), farmer and musician from Northumberland
John Armstrong (comics) (died 2018), British artist
John Armstrong (frontiersman) (1755–1816), Pennsylvania and Ohio
John Armstrong (journalist/poet) (1771–1797), Scotland
John Armstrong (model railroader) (1920–2004), US
John Armstrong (physician) (1784–1829), England
John Armstrong (poet) (1709–1779), Scotland
C. A. J. ("John") Armstrong (1909–1994), British medieval historian
John Alexander Armstrong (1922–2010), professor of political science at University of Wisconsin-Madison
John Archibald Armstrong (1917–2010), Canadian business executive
John Barclay Armstrong (1850–1913), Texas Ranger and U.S. Marshal
John S. Armstrong (1850–1908), developer, Texas
John Armstrong (engineer) (1775–1854), Britain
John Armstrong, New Zealand Army, made calculations for the Te Rata Bridge
John Eric Armstrong (born 1973), American serial killer

See also
Armstrong (surname)
Jack Armstrong (disambiguation)
"Johnnie Armstrong", a folk ballad about a Scottish raider and folk-hero